IWA World Tag Team Championship is a Tag Team Championship defended in Puerto Rico.The titles were first introduced in the first incarnation of the International Wrestling Association, where they are defended. They also made a brief appearance in the World Wrestling League (WWL) during 2018. It was introduced on January 6, 2000.

In 2021, Fernando Tonos and Manny Ferno created La Alianza IWE with the intention of completing a hostile takeover on behalf of International Wrestling Entertainment. Members of the stable won all of the IWA-PR titles. In response, general manager Chicky Starr and Savio Vega introduced parallel titles for each division in March 2022. While the storyline continued, there two sets of belts were contested independently of each other, with the originals being referenced to as the "IWE World Tag Team Championship".

History
In early 2015, while Vega was part of La Radio PR's "Más Allá del Ring" show, the title belts made appearances as part of the studio's decore along the Undisputed World Heavyweight and Intercontinental Championships

On May 19, 2018 it was reintroduced by Savio Vega as part of the main angle of WWL Golpe de Estado 2018, in which he led a group that intended to convert the WWL into the second incarnation of the IWA. At the event, Los Dueños de la Malicia carried the titles with them. However, after Golpe de Estado Dennis Rivera announced his retirement due to a legitimate knee injury. The titles made an appearance in an event sponsored by the municipal administration of Naranjito afterwards, but their status was not touched upon.

On July 20, 2018, a relaunch of IWA's Florida spinoff was also announced, along a tournament to fill the vacancies for the Undisputed World Heavyweight and World Tag Team Championships. However, with the relaunch of the IWA's main branch at Puerto Rico, the spinoff received its own titles.

In November 2019, one of the belts was carried by JC Navarro at Caution Wrestling Federation’s Aniversario event in Mexico. He did the same at Colombian Pro Wrestling’s Indy Circuit event, held on December 14, 2019.

Revival (2019) 
After IWA-PR resumed operations in 2018, a tournament to fill the vacancy was announced on February 22, 2019 as part of Revelaciones. The participating teams were West Side Mafia, Thunder & Lightning, Legio and The Drunken Xpress. The eliminatories were set to begin at Sangre x Sangre in March. The first two teams clashed prior to its start, with Thunder and Lightning securing a first-round bye with a win over the West Side Mafia.

Tournament

Title history

Reigns

Combined reigns

By team

By Wrestler

References

External links
Wrestling-titles

International Wrestling Association (Puerto Rico) championships
Tag team wrestling championships